The Puerto Rican broad-winged hawk (Buteo platypterus brunnescens) is an endangered subspecies of the broad-winged hawk (B. platypterus). It is a small hawk that occurs in Puerto Rico, inhabiting the Toro Negro State Forest. Its Spanish common name is guaragüao de bosque.

See also

Birds of Puerto Rico
Fauna of Puerto Rico
List of endemic fauna of Puerto Rico

References

Further reading
 U.S.Fish and Wildlife Service. 1997. Puerto Rican Broad-winged Hawk and Puerto Rican Sharp-shinned Hawk Recovery Plan. U.S. Fish and Wildlife Service, Atlanta, Georgia. 30pp.
 Broad-winged Hawk, Life History, All About Birds. Cornell Lab of Ornithology.
 

Puerto Rican broad-winged hawk
Endemic birds of Puerto Rico
Puerto Rican broad-winged hawk
ESA endangered species